Depienne Airfield is a World War II airfield in Tunisia, located approximately 12 km northeast of El Fahs, and 53 km southwest of Tunis. The airfield was first used by the German Luftwaffe in 1941 and 1942, and was captured by the British Army by a parachute attack on 3 December 1942.  It was later used by the United States Army Air Force Twelfth Air Force as a B-17 Flying Fortress heavy bomber airfield during the North African Campaign.

 HQ 5th Bombardment Wing, August–December 1943
 97th Bombardment Group, 15 August-20 December 1943, B-17 Flying Fortress

In aerial imagery, the airfield looks almost like it did in 1943 and is probably the most well-preserved wartime bomber field in Tunisia.   The runway, although deteriorated, along with all of the taxiways and aircraft hardstands are very much in evidence.   It is unclear what the current use of the facility is.

See also
 Boeing B-17 Flying Fortress airfields in the Mediterranean Theater of Operations

References

 Maurer, Maurer. Air Force Combat Units of World War II. Maxwell AFB, Alabama: Office of Air Force History, 1983. .
 

Airfields of the United States Army Air Forces in Tunisia
Airfields of the Fifteenth Air Force during World War II
Airports established in 1941